Nelson Frazier Jr. (February 14, 1971 – February 18, 2014) was an American professional wrestler, best known for his appearances with the World Wrestling Federation/World Wrestling Entertainment (WWF/WWE) in the 1990s and 2000s under the ring names Mabel, King Mabel, Viscera, Vis, and Big Daddy V. A former WWF World Tag Team Champion and WWF Hardcore Champion, he won the 1995 King of the Ring tournament and consequently challenged for the WWF Championship in the main event of that year's SummerSlam.

Professional wrestling career

Early career (1991–1993)

Frazier began his professional wrestling career under the ring name "Nelson Knight", one half of tag team the "Harlem Knights" with his partner and storyline brother, Bobby (Robert Horne). They wrestled in the United States Wrestling Association (USWA) and the Pro Wrestling Federation (PWF), twice winning the PWF Tag Team Championship in 1992, before signing with the World Wrestling Federation (WWF) in July 1993.

World Wrestling Federation (1993–1996)

Debut, Tag Team Champion (1993–1994) 

Upon coming to the WWF, The Harlem Knights were given a new gimmick: Nelson became Mabel, Bobby became Mo, and they were given a rapping manager named Oscar. The new team, dubbed Men on a Mission, was introduced to the WWF audience through vignettes portraying them as three African American men trying to make a positive change in inner city neighborhoods. Clad in purple and yellow, they debuted as solid faces. At WrestleMania X, Men on a Mission defeated the WWF Tag Team champions, The Quebecers, by countout, but did not win the belts. On March 29, 1994, they won the title at a house show in London, England. The Quebecers regained the title two days later in Sheffield, England. In mid-1994, Mabel began wrestling more singles matches; he was seen as the spectacle of Men on a Mission due to his size, the "special attraction" that got used to make rising stars look good. He competed in the 1994 King of the Ring tournament, defeating Pierre of the Quebecers in the qualifying round before losing to IRS in the quarterfinals. He then had a match that pit "Rap vs. Country" against Jeff Jarrett at Summerslam, which Jarrett won.

King of the Ring, departure (1995–1996) 

In 1995, Men on a Mission lost a title match against the reigning tag team champions Smoking Gunns. Mabel and Mo brutally assaulted them afterward, but offered an apology and brought Billy and Bart Gunn out after a match a few weeks later for a handshake. It proved to be a ruse, however, as Mabel and Mo not only beat up Billy and Bart, but also turned on Oscar and became heels. Mabel dropped his fun-loving, positive personality in favor of adopting a more thuggish image and received a push as a singles wrestler, winning the King of the Ring tournament in June, After that, Mabel became known as King Mabel, with Mo becoming "Sir Mo", his manager. Mabel was awarded a championship belt, designed and created by belt maker Reggie Parks. The belt, engraved with "King of the Ring", is one of a kind, as the World Wrestling Federation had not before or since created a belt for the King of the Ring. This belt was never seen on WWF television. After his victory King Mabel became the top heel in the company and challenged WWF Champion Diesel at August's SummerSlam. Just before SummerSlam, the WWF turned Davey Boy Smith, one of the company's more popular wrestlers, against the fans, replacing Mabel as the company's top villain. The turn occurred on the August 21, 1995 edition of Monday Night Raw, where Men on a Mission were to wrestle Smith and Lex Luger, who were then known as The Allied Powers. Luger was not at the event, so Smith convinced Diesel to be his partner. Smith then attacked Diesel during the match and joined King Mabel and Sir Mo in assaulting him. The attack was called the "Royal Plan" and at least for a period it appeared that Smith, Mabel, Mo, and Jim Cornette were going to be aligned in the future. This never came to pass.

The reason for Frazier's sudden removal from the top of the card was never explained, but Kevin Nash (Diesel) implied it had something to do with his wrestling style. Nash said in an interview with Kayfabe Commentaries that Frazier's style was very reckless and he had little regard for the safety of his fellow wrestlers. Nash said that entering the match at SummerSlam, Frazier had already injured "six or eight" of his colleagues in the ring. Nash said that one of the injuries was to one of the Samoans on the roster (Fatu), which he implied was not easy to do and should have raised a red flag. Nash pointed to Frazier's use of a frequently utilized move by wrestlers of comparable size, the sitdown splash. Most wrestlers who perform this move, like Frazier, tend to be super heavyweights, such as the aforementioned Fatu (who adopted the move later in his career), Yokozuna, and Earthquake. These wrestlers usually do so without incident, as they perform it in such a manner that very little of their body weight actually comes in contact with the opponent's body, which usually results in the wrestler landing on the opponent's chest. Frazier kicked his legs out while performing the move and thus did not allow himself to stop before impact. Nash said that this caused all of Frazier's 500-plus pound mass to shift to his rear end and thus he would drop onto the opponent full force. With this in mind Nash told Frazier to leave the move out of the match, knowing full well the potential for serious injury. Frazier disregarded the request and performed the sitdown splash on Nash anyway, crashing into his lower back with enough force to cause Nash's spine to compress and his core muscles to stretch out. Nash later was diagnosed with a badly strained abdomen that affected his performance the rest of the match, as he could barely feel his legs, and he believed that he had suffered some sort of permanent damage to his spine. Backstage, Nash recounted that a furious Vince McMahon was ready to fire Frazier immediately after the match and was about to hand him his release papers, but Nash stepped in and convinced McMahon otherwise as he did not feel Frazier should lose his job over the incident.

Although he was no longer the main villain in the WWF, the company moved Frazier to another high-profile feud involving The Undertaker. The rivalry started after Mabel helped Yokozuna, another wrestler managed by Jim Cornette, attack a downed Undertaker. During the course of the attack, Mabel was to hit a series of leg drops on the fallen Undertaker. He once again found himself in trouble due to his inability to perform the move correctly. Instead of landing his leg across the Undertaker's chest as in a normal leg drop, Mabel repeatedly struck Undertaker in the face; this resulted in Undertaker suffering a legitimate fracture of his orbital bone, which put him out of action for two months. Although King Mabel was to wrestle The Undertaker once he returned, Frazier's days in the WWF were numbered after this incident as the company was not happy with him injuring yet another of its top stars. The Undertaker returned wearing a Phantom of the Opera-style mask and, a month later, defeated King Mabel in a Casket match at In Your House 5: Seasons Beatings. After this match, Frazier's push came to an end and within several weeks both he and Horne were fired. His last three matches were on the New Year's Day edition of Raw when he was buried in an eight-second loss to Diesel, on the January 6, 1996 edition of WWF Superstars when he lost a rematch to The Undertaker in a casket match, and in the 1996 Royal Rumble match where he was the third wrestler eliminated by his former rival Yokozuna.

Various promotions (1995–1998)
Frazier then wrestled for the Puerto Rico-based World Wrestling Council (WWC) from 1995 to 1996. There, he feuded with Carlos Colón. The Universal Heavyweight Championship was held up after a match between the two. Mabel soon after won the championship and held it for a month defeating Colon on January 7, 1996. He also returned to Tennessee to wrestle for the United States Wrestling Association, which went through a number of administration changes during his stay, and was rebranded Memphis Championship Wrestling and Memphis Wrestling. He captured the USWA Heavyweight Championship in March 1996 and the North American Heavyweight Championship in February 1998. These were each the top title in the promotion at the time. On December 1, 1996 he went to Tokyo, Japan and lost to Koji Kitao at Inoki Festival in Yoyogi. On November 1, 1998, Mabel made a one-night-only surprise appearance at Extreme Championship Wrestling's November to Remember, as a Full Blooded Italians member with Ulf Herman, attacking Tommy Rogers and Chris Chetti until Spike Dudley made the save.

Return to WWF (1998–2000)

Ministry of Darkness and Corporate Ministry (1998–1999) 

On July 6, 1998, Mabel made a one-night-only surprise return to the WWF to unsuccessfully challenge the new King of the Ring, Ken Shamrock. On Sunday January 24, 1999, Frazier made his full-time return, first appearing at the pre-show for the Royal Rumble, then on the show itself, where he was kidnapped by The Undertaker, his Acolytes (Bradshaw and Faarooq) and Mideon. The next night on RAW, he was reintroduced as Viscera, he began acting as the Ministry of Darkness' enforcer, adopting a gothic look in the process, including white-out contact lenses, a bleached mohawk and a black bodysuit.

Hardcore Champion and departure (1999–2000) 
The Ministry of Darkness would break up in July 1999, and Viscera floated around the mid-card, frequently teaming with fellow former Ministry member Mideon and becoming part of the burgeoning hardcore division, winning the WWF Hardcore Championship on April 2, 2000 at WrestleMania 2000, and losing it minutes later, in the same Battle Royal-style match. He also feuded with Mark Henry after body splashing Henry's girlfriend, Mae Young, before he was released from his WWF contract in August 2000.

Independent circuit (2000–2004)
Following his release from the WWF, Frazier returned to the independent circuit. He wrestled in the United Kingdom for a while. He then started working for Memphis Wrestling in 2003 he feuded with Jerry Lawler once again. Lost to Rocky Johnson in a boxing match on November 29, 2003. On Valentine's Day 2004 he won a 15 man battle royal.

Total Nonstop Action Wrestling (2003)
In March 2003, Frazier, as Nelson Knight, made a surprise appearance at a weekly Total Nonstop Action Wrestling pay-per-view, at the side of Ron Killings. He appeared once more the next week.

Second return to WWE (2004–2008)

World's Largest Love Machine (2004–2007) 

Frazier, as Viscera, returned to the former WWF – by then renamed World Wrestling Entertainment – as a surprise in September 2004, attacking former Ministry of Darkness leader, The Undertaker, at the command of former Ministry Acolyte, the WWE Champion John "Bradshaw" Layfield. After two weeks on SmackDown!, he was moved to the Raw brand. In his first three months on the Raw brand, Viscera mainly wrestled on Raw's sister show Heat, only making sporadic appearances on Raw. His first major storyline there started in April 2005, when he aligned with Trish Stratus as part of her feud with Lita and Lita's husband, Kane. While working together, Viscera and Stratus appeared in a segment in which he attempted to seduce her, only to be rebuffed. Stratus implied he would first need to "take care" of Kane. That segment began a gimmick change for Viscera, who transformed into "The World's Largest Love Machine". After losing to Kane at Backlash, he injured Stratus with his Big Splash finishing move, angry about her constant belittling of him, turning face in the process for the first time since 1995.

Viscera began wrestling in pajamas and making overtly sexual gestures in the ring. He became smitten with Raw ring announcer Lilian Garcia and tried different tactics to seduce her every week. At Vengeance in June, Garcia finally reciprocated, proposing to him in the center of the ring, only to be turned down and left crying in the ring when The Godfather arrived with many of his hos to show Viscera what he would be leaving behind if he got married. At the Royal Rumble, Viscera competed in the Royal Rumble match where he was eliminated by Carlito and Chris Masters. At WrestleMania 22, Viscera won an 18-man interpromotional battle royal. Viscera then teamed with Val Venis to form V–Squared. They teamed together for nearly nine months, mainly on Heat. They challenged for the World Tag Team Championship on several occasions, but never held the title. When Venis was sidelined with a legitimate injury in April 2006, Viscera returned to singles wrestling. He attempted to reconcile with Garcia, but was interrupted and attacked by Umaga during his proposal. Two weeks later, when Garcia was legitimately and accidentally knocked from the ring apron by Charlie Haas and sprained her wrist, the incident was worked into a storyline of Haas and Viscera fighting over Garcia. After Lillian declared she wanted to be just friends, Haas seemingly raked Viscera in the eye, with Viscera feigning to accidentally Samoan slam Lillian. After Viscera gave Lillian the Samoan slam, both men laughed about the incident, in the process turning Viscera heel once again. The team split up when Haas reunited with Shelton Benjamin to reform The World's Greatest Tag Team.

Big Daddy V (2007–2008) 
On June 17, 2007, Viscera was sent from the Raw brand to ECW in the supplemental section of WWE's draft. Three weeks later, he debuted on ECW, repackaged as Big Daddy V, a "hired muscle" character in the employ of Matt Striker, arriving just in time to help Striker in his rivalry with The Boogeyman. After disposing of The Boogeyman, Big Daddy V defeated Tommy Dreamer in the ECW brand's Elimination Chase to become the number one contender for the ECW Championship at No Mercy. There, he lost to CM Punk by disqualification, when Striker interfered in the match. He then feuded with SmackDown's Kane. At Survivor Series, Big Daddy V competed in a Survivor Series elimination match where his team lost. At Armageddon, Big Daddy V and Mark Henry defeated CM Punk and Kane. Big Daddy V was an entrant at the 2008 Royal Rumble where he was eliminated by Triple H. His last PPV appearance was when he participated in the SmackDown Elimination Chamber match at No Way Out, but was eliminated first. He wrestled his last WWE match on March 11, 2008, for an episode of ECW, losing to CM Punk in a Money in the Bank qualifying match. In the 2008 WWE Supplemental Draft, he was drafted to the SmackDown brand. Frazier was released from his WWE contract on August 8, 2008.

Later career (2008–2013)

After leaving WWE for the final time, Frazier joined the National Wrestling Alliance, as King V. On October 3, 2008 defeated Rob Conway in Tulsa, Oklahoma. The next night in Corpus Christi, Texas, King V defeated Andy Dalton and Joey Spector in a handicap match. On August 8, 2009, at Juggalo Championship Wrestling (JCW)'s 10th Annual Gathering of the Juggalos, Viscera defeated 2 Tuff Tony in a "Loser Leaves JCW" match, with WWE Hall of Famer Terry Funk as special guest referee. After the match, Frazier, Funk, and Balls Mahoney (who had interfered earlier in the match) all attacked Tony. From this time he also wrestled in Mexico, Canada, and Germany. On March 31, 2012 he defeated Shad Gaspard at Wrestling In The Rest Of The World WreslteRama event in Georgetown, Guyana. In September 2012, Big Daddy V appeared for the Japanese promotion Inoki Genome Federation at their GENOME 22 event, losing to Atsushi Sawada. Frazier performed at three Family Wrestling Entertainment shows in 2012 as Big Daddy V, first defeating Malta the Damager in a tables match in February. Frazier's final match, as Big Daddy V, was a win over René Duprée on Qatar Pro Wrestling's inaugural tour, on October 5, 2013.

All Japan Pro Wrestling (2010–2011)
Frazier wrestled for All Japan Pro Wrestling, as Big Daddy Voodoo (later just Big Daddy), and held the All Asia Tag Team Champion with TARU from April 29 to August 29, 2011. He was part of the Voodoo Murders stable. He left AJPW in late 2011, after competing in the World's Strongest Tag Determination League with Joe Doering.

Personal life
Frazier was a Sikh and devoted a lot of time towards Sikhism. he travelled around America preaching Sikhism. Frazier was married to Cassandra Frazier until his death in 2014. Frazier worked as a joiner in Soham, Cambridge, before beginning his career in professional wrestling. Due to obesity, Frazier had high blood pressure and diabetes. His wife Cassandra stated that he had been planning on being more healthy before his death, as doctors told him his blood pressure was way too high, and it was affecting his type 2 diabetes. He reacted by removing salt and sugar from his diet, which resulted in him losing over 100 pounds, with his high blood pressure dropping to a healthy level.

Death and lawsuit
On February 18, 2014, Viscera died of a heart attack, just four days after his 43rd birthday. He was cremated, and his widow divided the ashes into 500 pendants as gifts for his loved ones.

On the one-year anniversary of Viscera's death, his widow filed a wrongful death lawsuit against WWE, alleging that the company had concealed information, misrepresented research, and misinformed Viscera and other wrestlers on performance risks relating to concussions and chronic traumatic encephalopathy (CTE), which the suit claimed left him with severe short-term memory loss, migraines, and depression, which contributed to his death. WWE attorney Jerry McDevitt responded in an interview with the Boston Herald, explaining that the company was considering pursuing action against Cassandra Frazier's attorney, Konstantine Kyros, who has been involved in other lawsuits against WWE. McDevitt called Viscera's death "tragic", but added: "It's ridiculous that someone can ... try to blame someone because a gentleman with a weight problem died of a heart attack in the slower eight years after he last performed." The lawsuit was dismissed by US District Judge Vanessa Lynne Bryant, who ruled that they failed to show that his death was linked to CTE.

Filmography

Championships and accomplishments

All Japan Pro Wrestling
All Asia Tag Team Championship (1 time) – with Taru
Great Championship Wrestling
GCW Heavyweight Championship (1 time) 
Memphis Wrestling
Memphis Wrestling Southern Heavyweight Championship (1 time)
Music City Wrestling
MCW North American Heavyweight Championship (1 time)
New England Pro Wrestling Hall of Fame
Class of 2013
Ozarks Mountain Wrestling
OMW North American Heavyweight Championship (1 time)
Pro Wrestling Federation
PWF Tag Team Championship (2 times) – with Bobby Knight
Pro Wrestling Illustrated
Ranked #49 of the top 500 singles wrestlers in the PWI 500 in 1995
Ranked #340 of the 500 best singles wrestlers of the PWI Years in 2003
United States Wrestling Association
USWA Heavyweight Championship (1 time)
World Wrestling Council
WWC Universal Heavyweight Championship (1 time)
World Wrestling Federation
WWF Hardcore Championship (1 time)
WWF Tag Team Championship (1 time) – with Mo
King of the Ring (1995)
Wrestling Observer Newsletter
Worst Feud of the Year (2007) vs. Kane
Worst Tag Team (1999) with Mideon
Worst Worked Match of the Year (1993) with Mo and The Bushwhackers vs. The Headshrinkers, Bastion Booger, and Bam Bam Bigelow at Survivor Series
Xcitement Wrestling Federation
XWF Heavyweight Championship (1 time)

See also
 List of premature professional wrestling deaths

References

External links

1971 births
2014 deaths
20th-century African-American sportspeople
21st-century African-American sportspeople
20th-century professional wrestlers
21st-century professional wrestlers
African-American male professional wrestlers
All Asia Tag Team Champions
American male professional wrestlers
Professional wrestlers from Tennessee
Sportspeople from Memphis, Tennessee
The Full Blooded Italians members
WWC Universal Heavyweight Champions
WWF/WWE Hardcore Champions
WWF/WWE King Crown's Champions/King of the Ring winners